Michael Milton Lewis (born April 29, 1980) is a former American football strong safety. He was drafted by the Philadelphia Eagles in the second round of the 2002 NFL Draft and also played for the San Francisco 49ers and St. Louis Rams. He was a Pro Bowl selection with the Eagles in 2004. Lewis played college football at Colorado.

College career
Lewis out of Rosenberg, Texas played for Lamar Consolidated High School from 1994 to 1997 before heading to the University of Colorado.  Lewis twice won Colorado's Dave Jones Award for the most outstanding defensive player and the Hale Irwin Award for the most outstanding defensive back in his junior and senior seasons. As a junior, he made a career-high 117 tackles on his way to first-team All-Big 12 Conference honors. As a senior, he was a unanimous All-Big 12 Conference first-team choice, earned third-team All-America honors, and was a semi-finalist for the Jim Thorpe Award, given to the nation's top defensive back. He led the team with 112 tackles and five interceptions, one of which he returned for a touchdown. He closed his career ranked 9th on the school's all-time list with 336 tackles, second in forced fumbles with 10 and tied for 12th with nine interceptions. He also holds the school record with 6.5 career sacks for a defensive back.

Pre-draft

Professional career

Philadelphia Eagles
Lewis was drafted by the Philadelphia Eagles in the second round of the 2002 NFL Draft. As a rookie, he started 4 out of 14 games and recorded 49 tackles, a sack, and an interception. In 2003, he became a full-time starter, replacing Blaine Bishop, and remained the starter alongside free safety Brian Dawkins up to the 2006 season. In 2005, he along with Dawkins were selected as the starters for the 2004 Pro Bowl for the NFC squad. But Lewis had a tough year in 2006. After giving up numerous big plays, he was benched for Sean Considine, starting only 6 of 14 games. He finished his career with the Eagles recording 386 tackles, six sacks, and nine interceptions.

San Francisco 49ers
On March 2, 2007, Lewis signed with the San Francisco 49ers. Lewis re-gained his starting role with the 49ers and had a good season, finishing his first season with the team starting all 16 games recording 104 tackles, 1.5 sacks, and two interceptions.

On October 1, 2010, it was reported that Lewis would not be traveling with the 49ers to their next game at Atlanta after sitting out that day's practice for "personal reasons". It was further reported that Lewis has asked the team for his release. For the season until that point, Lewis had started each regular season game and had 10 tackles with no interceptions, forced fumbles, or sacks.

On October 4, 2010, Lewis was released by the 49ers and became a free agent.

St. Louis Rams
Lewis was signed by the St. Louis Rams on October 27, 2010. He was later released at the end of the season and later retired.

NFL statistics

Regular season

Postseason

Personal
During the week of Super Bowl XXXIX in Jacksonville, Florida Lewis won the annual EA Sports Madden Bowl competition. The tournament featured eight NFL players and Lewis claimed the top spot by defeating Steelers QB Ben Roethlisberger, Colts DE Dwight Freeney (the two-time defending champion), and Broncos RB Willis McGahee.

During his sophomore year at Colorado University, Lewis was diagnosed with atrial fibrillation.  While not life-threatening, it has contributed to Michael Lewis becoming an active spokesperson for Heart Disease awareness.  He has served as a spokesperson for the Philadelphia chapter of the American Heart Association, served as the Honorary Chairperson for Philadelphia Heart Walk, and joined Steve Young in San Jose to promote the American Heart Association's Start! campaign.

Lewis' nephews are former Tampa Bay Buccaneers running back Jacquizz Rodgers and former Atlanta Falcons wide receiver James Rodgers.

References

External links

San Francisco 49ers bio
St. Louis Rams bio

1980 births
Living people
People from Richmond, Texas
Sportspeople from the Houston metropolitan area
Players of American football from Texas
American football safeties
Colorado Buffaloes football players
Philadelphia Eagles players
San Francisco 49ers players
St. Louis Rams players
National Conference Pro Bowl players